Paul Boehm (born August 10, 1974, in Calgary, Alberta) is a Canadian skeleton racer who has competed since 1998. He finished fourth in the men's skeleton event at the 2006 Winter Olympics in Turin.

Boehm's best finish at the FIBT World Championships was 14th in the men's skeleton event at St. Moritz in 2007.

References
2006 men's skeleton results
CBC.ca profile
FIBT profile
Skeletonsport.com profile

1974 births
Living people
Canadian people of German descent
Canadian male skeleton racers
Sportspeople from Calgary
Skeleton racers at the 2006 Winter Olympics
Olympic skeleton racers of Canada
20th-century Canadian people
21st-century Canadian people